Trivirostra yangi is a species of small sea snail, a marine gastropod mollusk in the family Triviidae, the false cowries or trivias.

Description

Distribution

References

External links
 
 http://www.jaxshells.org/29444.htm

Triviidae
Gastropods described in 2006